The men's ISSF 50 meter pistol (then known as free pistol) was one of the fifteen shooting events at the 1996 Summer Olympics, held on 23 July at the Wolf Creek Shooting Complex in Atlanta. There were 45 competitors from 28 nations. It was the first time decimals were used in the 50 metre pistol finals. Boris Kokorev set a new Olympic record after scoring 570 points in the qualification round and 96.4 in the final, winning the gold medal, while places 2 through 5 were occupied by Belarusian and Italian shooters. Russia, Belarus, and Italy all received their first medal in the free pistol. Silver medalist Igor Basinski was the ninth man to win multiple medals in the event.

Background
This was the 19th appearance of the ISSF 50 meter pistol event. The event was held at every Summer Olympics from 1896 to 1920 (except 1904, when no shooting events were held) and from 1936 to 2016; it was nominally open to women from 1968 to 1980, although very few women participated these years. A separate women's event would be introduced in 1984. 1896 and 1908 were the only Games in which the distance was not 50 metres; the former used 30 metres and the latter 50 yards.

Five of the eight finalists from the 1992 Games returned: gold medalist Kanstantsin Lukashyk of the Unified Team (now competing for Belarus), silver medalist Wang Yifu of China, bronze medalist Ragnar Skanåker of Sweden, fifth-place finisher Sorin Babii of Romania, and eighth-place finisher Tanyu Kiryakov of Bulgaria. Skanåker was in his seventh Games, having won gold in 1972, silver in 1984 and 1988, and placing in the top 10 in 1976 and 1980 along with his 1992 final appearance. Wang was also a long-time veteran, earning bronze in 1984 before reaching the finals in 1988 and 1992. Babii was newer, but like Lukashyk and Skanåker had won Olympic gold (in 1988). Kiryakov would go on to win gold four years later; along with the 1996 winner Boris Kokorev, there were 5 past or future gold medalists in the event competing. Wang was the reigning (1994) world champion, with Ukraine's Viktor Makarov the runner-up.

Belarus, the Czech Republic, Kyrgyzstan, Slovakia, Ukraine, and Uzbekistan each made their debut in the event. Sweden and the United States each made their 17th appearance, tied for most of any nation.

Kokorev used a Tula TOZ 35.

Competition format
The competition featured two rounds, qualifying and final. The qualifying round was the same as the previous competitions: each shooter fired 60 shots, in 6 series of 10 shots each, at a distance of 50 metres. The target was round, 50 centimetres in diameter, with 10 scoring rings. Scoring for each shot was up to 10 points, in increments of 1 point. The maximum score possible was 600 points. The top 8 shooters advanced to a final; ties necessary for qualifying were broken by 6th-series score, while other ties were not broken. They shot an additional series of 10 shots, with the score added to their qualifying round score to give a 70-shot total. The 1996 competition added decimal scoring to the final; shots could score up to 10.9 for the final. The total maximum was therefore 709.0. Ties were broken first by final round score. Any pistol was permitted.

Records
Prior to this competition, the existing world and Olympic records were as follows.

Boris Kokorev set a new Olympic record for the final round with 666.4 points.

Schedule

Results

Qualifying

Final

References

Sources

Shooting at the 1996 Summer Olympics
Men's 1996
Men's events at the 1996 Summer Olympics